John Rivas (born August 9, 1964) is a Puerto-Rican graphic designer and publicist, and the creator of the comic strip BONZZO The Comic Strip. 

He has a BA in graphic arts, cum laude from the University of Puerto Rico; a master's degree in digital graphic design from Atlantic University; and various instructor certifications and accreditations in graphic design, digital photography and operating systems.

He is also a graduate program professor at Atlantic University, professional cartoonist and illustrator, advertising manager, photojournalist, writer, editor, commercial character designer, photographer, artist, and graphic design and advertising professional Instructor.

Early years
Rivas was born in Aibonito, Puerto Rico and raised in Orocovis.

Professional career
Rivas has about 30 years of experience, from the analog traditional artwork to the new digital era in graphic design. He also has experience in making campaign and marketing strategies for his customers. He is the president of John Rivas Publicidad, an advertising agency located in San Juan, Puerto Rico. His agency offers services including digital graphic art design, advertising in general, media placing, digital photography, and web design.

He has written several technology reviews, published in the Puerto Rico Daily Sun newspaper. Some of them are: "Protect your iPhone 4 with a Ballistic Case", "Hello Moshi: The First "Listening Alarm Clock"", "iPhone 4 Tough Cases: Ballistic vs. Otterbox", "Comfortable Browsing with ErgoMotion Mouse", "Avoid Overweight Luggage Charges with Balanzza Mini","Hercules Portable Speakers for a Busy Life", "Nica sunrise… a sleek and stylish bluetooth headset", "Car and desk dock chargers for the nica sunrise", "Best Watch Kits for iPod Nano: TikTok + LunaTik", "Smartphones Protection with BullGuard Mobile Security 10", "V-MODA Remix Remote: More than Just a Pair of Headphones", "A Very Cool Gadget: Swann's PenCam Mini Video Camera & Recorder", "MountMe Freedom for iPad", and "Get a Better Grip of your iPad with the HandStand".

As a photojournalist, he has published several articles, including "UPR Carolina Graphic Arts Students visit HERA Printing", "Festival
Tierra Adentro", "Gearing up for excellence", and "Local cartoonist Nadia Martin dies".

As an ACI (Adobe Certified Instructor), Rivas has given various "Adobe Photoshop CS4 and its use in Graphic Arts" seminars to students at the University of Puerto Rico. In these seminars, students are able to learn about the art of photography, computers and its use in the graphic arts.  On 2011, he joined Microdata Training as the Adobe Master Instructor for their Adobe Training programs. 

Rivas is a member of the International Society of Caricature Artists  and also became a member of the IAVA (International Academy of the Visual Arts) on 2012.  The IAVA is a membership-based organization of leading professionals from various disciplines of the visual arts dedicated to embracing progress and the evolving nature of traditional and interactive media.

Certifications

 ACI Adobe Certified Instructor: Photoshop CS4 - InDesign CS3 - Illustrator CS3 - Dreamweaver CS3 - Flash CS3, Adobe Web Specialist, Acrobat 9 Professional
 ACE Adobe Certified Expert: Photoshop CS4 - InDesign CS3 - Illustrator CS3 - Dreamweaver CS3 - Flash CS3, Adobe Web Specialist, Acrobat 9 Professional
 MCT - Microsoft Certified Trainer (Microsoft)
 IC3 Instructor - Internet And Computing Core Certification – Global Standard 3(Certiport)
 Apple Certified Help Desk Specialist 10.4 (Apple)

BONZZO The Comic Strip
Since he was young, Rivas had on his mind the development  of a cartoon character. After he developed the character, he used it to promote his advertising agency. A few years later, the character which he named BONZZO was officially born.

There are no syndicates in the U.S. or Puerto Rico, but BONZZO was first published in 1998 in two of the four leading newspapers in Puerto Rico, El Mundo and El Vocero. His comic strips were published in both newspapers daily. Later, it was also published in El Reportero newspaper in Huntsville, Alabama. It was also published, years later, in the Primera Hora newspaper in Puerto Rico. As of 2012,  BONZZOs daily comic strip may be viewed at his website.

Rivas describes "BONZZO" as a young likable adult facing life with a child's mentality. Rivas designed some special "BONZZO" strips commemorating NASA's achievements, including "Beyond the Moon", a calendar of the year 2000 honoring Hispanic heritage.

While U.S. syndication is one of Rivas's immediate goals, he also hopes to create a "BONZZO" theme park, "Bonzzolandia".

NASA's BONZZO Award

NASA also instated the BONZZO Award, a pint-size BONZZO statue that will be given annually to the individual who makes the biggest contribution to NASA's Hispanic program.  On October 12, 2000, Charles H. Scales, the director of Equal Opportunity at NASA's Marshall Space Flight Center, was the first recipient of this award: the statue was signed by Marshall Center Director Art Stephenson, Puerto Rican Gov. Pedro Rosselló and John Rivas, who donated
the statue to honor the work of Hispanics at the Marshall Center.  "Charles is an excellent choice for this first award," said Elia Ordonez, Hispanic Employment Program manager at the Marshall Center. "He has contributed much to the quality of life in our community and, in particular, the Hispanic community at Marshall."

In 1999, Rivas exposed four of BONZZOs NASA-themed comic strips at NASA's Kennedy Space Center, Florida at its Hispanic Luncheon & Art Show, which was dedicated to him.

NASA celebrated last year's "Hispanic Heritage Month" at the Kennedy Space Center with an exhibit of BONZZO comic strips. A life-sized BONZZO figure marched in the 2004 Puerto Rican Day Parade celebrated in New York City.

Later years

The Art of BONZZO Visits the General Archive of Puerto Rico - Big Comic Strips Expo
On May 10, 2012 the General Archive of Puerto Rico opened its doors to the exposition "The Art of BONZZO Visits the General Archive of Puerto Rico - Big Comic Strips Expo". Over 25 of BONZZOs comic strips and memorabilia were shown there until October 31, 2012. That same day, on the exposition's opening, BONZZO had its second USPS pictorial cancellation, in which the General Archive of Puerto Rico, located in San Juan, became "The Art of Bonzzo at the General Archive of Puerto Rico Station". BONZZO also got his First USPS Commemorative Stamp that day. The 45 cent postage seal will perpetuate Rivas' character in Bonzzo in the chronicles of American history.

Zero Violence Cartoon Exposition
On 2012 John Rivas also participated, with various of his BONZZO works, in a zero violence cartoon exposition held at the General Archive of Puerto Rico.

Recent awards
Also on 2012, Rivas won four American Packaging Design Awards, awarded by the prestigious Graphic Design USA for four BONZZO packaging designs: "Big Comic Strips BONZZO Mobile Carrying Cart", "Big Comic Strips BONZZO Exposition Promo Life-Size Stand", "The Art of BONZZO Book Case", and "100% The Art of Comic Strips BONZZO Gift Box". "To me, it has been a very pleasant surprise and a great honor to be recognized with four American Package Design Awards 2012 from the prestigious Graphic Design USA," said Rivas, creator of the comic book BONZZO, which has been published by several media on the Island and the United States. The four designs created by Rivas, were selected from more than 1,600 competitors from across the United States mainland and elsewhere and its territories. Rivas' four packaging design winners are published in the journal GDUSA and on the website of the organization.  The American Package Design Awards celebrates well-designed and well-executed graphic designs of course, but also the power of design to advance the brand promise and forge an emotional connection with the buyer at the moment of truth, according to a press release.

Rivas's designs received this same year five Communicators Awards: Communicator Award of Excellence 2012 Integrated Campaign Winner (Gold Award), for "BONZZO The Comic Strip",  Communicator Award of Excellence 2012 Print Winner (Gold Award), for "Posters Promo BONZZO Postal Stamp", Communicator Award of Distinction 2012 Print (Silver Award) for the Logo UNEX - Universidad Extendida UPR in Bayamón, made for the University of Puerto Rico in Bayamón for the Continued
(Post-Graduate Education Department), Communicator Award of Distinction 2012 Print (Silver Award) for the Logo CuCo The Bull, made for the University of Puerto Rico in Cayey, and Communicator Award of Distinction 2012 Website Winner (Silver Award), for "BONZZO The Comic Strip/BONZZO La Tirilla Comica Website".

The Comic Strip is a Serious Thing: BONZZO@CORMO UPR in Utuado
On December 1, 2012, at 1:00 p.m., John Rivas opened BONZZO's exposition, "The Comic Strip is a Serious Thing: BONZZO@CORMO UPR in Utuado" at the University of Puerto Rico, Utuado Campus (CORMO). The title of the exhibition: "The comic book is a serious thing," is a line taken from the speech of the Secretary of State of Puerto Rico, Hon. Kenneth D. McClintock, on May 10, 2012, during the opening of "BONZZO's Big Comic Strips Expo: The Art of BONZZO Visit the General Archive of Puerto Rico".

See also

 List of Puerto Ricans
 BONZZO

References

Puerto Rican comics artists
Puerto Rican cartoonists
Living people
People from Aibonito, Puerto Rico
1964 births